East 15 Acting School (East 15) is a British drama school in Loughton, Essex. Its degrees are awarded by the University of Essex, with which it merged on 1 September 2000. As of 2020, Essex University, where East 15 is located, has been ranked No. 1 UK university for studying drama and dance in the Guardian's University Guide. It is a member of the Federation of Drama Schools.

History
East 15 Acting School was founded in 1961 by Margaret Bury. 

.

Notable alumni

Notable graduates from East 15 include:

 Maisie Adam
 Damon Albarn (did not graduate)
 Arsher Ali
 Patricia Allison
 Peter Armitage
 Annette Badland
 Marcus Bentley
 Linnea Berthelsen
 Sian Breckin
 David L. Boushey
 Marji Campi
 Ian Champion
 Nathan Clarke
 Peter Cleall
 Susannah Corbett
 Stephen Daldry
 April De Angelis
 Janine Duvitski
 Adam El Hagar
 Alan Ford
 Paul Garnault
 Alex Giannini
 Chris Haywood
 Elizabeth Henstridge
 The Kipper Kids
 Gabriella Leon
 Kevin Lloyd
 John McArdle
 Sera-Lys McArthur
 Ann Mitchell
 Diane Morgan
 Billy Murray
 Michael Parr
 Vicki Pepperdine
 Jenny Platt
 George Rossi
 Chris Ryan
 Ruth Sheen
 Marlene Sidaway
 Alison Steadman
 Gwen Taylor
 Abigail Thorn
 Kraig Thornber
 Oliver Tobias
 Rhydian Vaughan
 Steven Waddington
 Marc Warren
 Clive Wedderburn
 Kate Williams
 David Yip
 Meng'er Zhang

References

External links
Official website

Drama schools in the United Kingdom
University of Essex
Educational institutions established in 1961
1961 establishments in England
Loughton